Chajiaotan Bridge  is a suspension bridge in Xishui County, Guizhou, China. The bridge is part of the Xugu Expressway carrying traffic over the Chishui River. Construction began in 2014 and the bridge opened in 2020. The main span of the bridge is  making it one of the longest ever built. Other high bridges on the Sichuan section of the Xugu expressway include Shilianghe, Luosizhai, Tiantanghe, Modaoxi and two crossings of the Gulin River.

Chishuihe Bridge Chajiaotan is the last link along the  Xugu expressway that connects the city of Xuyong on the G76 with the city of Gulin and eventually the Chishui River gorge where it will connect with the Renchi expressway in Guizhou. Construction was completed in 2016 on all but the very eastern end of the expressway. Some sources have a height of  but it is not clear if this is to the river surface or the bottom of the river.

See also
 List of bridges in China
 List of highest bridges in the world
 List of longest suspension bridge spans

External links
https://web.archive.org/web/20190426120448/http://highestbridges.com/wiki/index.php?title=Chishuihe_Bridge_Chajiaotan

the vedio about the aerial photography of chishuihe bridge

References

Bridges in Guizhou
Suspension bridges in China
Buildings and structures under construction in China
Bridges under construction